Gelasius is a masculine given name, from Greek  (Gelásios), from Ancient Greek  (gélasis, “laughing”). It may refer to:

Pope Gelasius I (died 496) 
Pope Gelasius II (died 1119) 
Gelasius of Cyzicus (fifth century), ecclesiastical writer
Gelasius of Caesarea (died 395), bishop of Caesarea 
Gelasius of Nilopolis (fifth century), Egyptian Christian abbot
Gelasius, Archbishop of Armagh (1137 to 1174) 
Gelasius O'Cullenan, Cistercian Abbot of Boyle, Ireland